Little Compton is a village and civil parish in the Stratford-on-Avon district, in south Warwickshire, England, and is located about three miles east of Moreton-in-Marsh. Historically it was an exclave of Gloucestershire. The centre of the village is home to the Reed Business School, under the company of the same name (Reed), and is owned by Sir Alec Reed.

In popular culture
Brewery Row and the Reed Business School, within Little Compton, were filming locations for Doctor Who's 100th serial, The Stones of Blood.

Public transport
The village is served by few and infrequent bus services.

References 

Villages in Warwickshire
Civil parishes in Warwickshire
Stratford-on-Avon District
Places formerly in Gloucestershire